Betzdorf is a former Verbandsgemeinde ("collective municipality") in the district of Altenkirchen, in Rhineland-Palatinate, Germany. On 1 January 2017 it merged into the new Verbandsgemeinde Betzdorf-Gebhardshain. The seat of the Verbandsgemeinde was in Betzdorf.

The Verbandsgemeinde Betzdorf consisted of the following Ortsgemeinden ("local municipalities"):

 Alsdorf 
 Betzdorf
 Grünebach 
 Scheuerfeld 
 Wallmenroth

Former Verbandsgemeinden in Rhineland-Palatinate